Béla Kárpáti (30 September 1929 – 31 December 2003) was a Hungarian football defender who played for Hungary in the 1954 and 1958 FIFA World Cups. He also played for Győri ETO FC and Vasas SC.

References

External links
 FIFA profile

1929 births
2003 deaths
Hungarian footballers
Hungary international footballers
Association football defenders
Győri ETO FC players
Vasas SC players
1954 FIFA World Cup players
1958 FIFA World Cup players
Hungarian football managers
Fehérvár FC managers
Zalaegerszegi TE managers